Nicolas Baudin Island is an island in the Australian state of South Australia about  west of Cape Blanche on the west coast of Eyre Peninsula  about  south south-west of the town of Streaky Bay. The island is notable as a breeding site for Australian sea lions.  The island has enjoyed protected area status since 2003 when it became part of the Nicolas Baudin Island Conservation Park.

Description
It is composed of large boulders and slabs of red-brown granite, as well as sandy areas and intertidal pools. Most of the island is low and partly inundated each high tide, with several elevated boulders forming the highest points.
Since January 2003, access to both to the island and the waters surrounding it have been prohibited as a regulatory measure to protect a breeding site for the Australian sea lion.

Formation, geology and oceanography
Nicolas Baudin Island was formed between 6000 and 7700 years ago following the rise of sea levels at the start of the Holocene. The island's geology consists of a basement of a granite associated with the Gawler Craton and which is bare of any remnants of overlying layers of rock.

Flora and fauna

Flora
As of 2007, Nicolas Baudin Island is reported as not having any terrestrial vegetation.

Fauna
Surveys of fauna present on Nicolas Baudin Island have focused on vertebrates such as seal lions, seals and birds.

Sea lions and seals
The island is notable as a rookery for the Australian sea lion and as a haul out for New Zealand fur seals.

Birds
Surveys of bird life carried out from 2002 to 2005 revealed breeding populations of Pacific gull and sooty oystercatcher as well as sightings of the following species using the island as a roosting point: little penguin, short-tailed shearwater, Australasian gannet, little pied cormorant, black-faced cormorant, pied cormorant, little black cormorant, great cormorant, Australian pelican, white-faced heron, silver gull, caspian tern and crested tern.

History

European discovery and use
Nicolas Baudin Island was not discovered by either of the expeditions led by Matthew Flinders and Nicolas Baudin.  It was presumably identified during surveys carried out by the Government of South Australia following settlement in 1836 as ‘a result of the need to document South Australian waters and, in particular, their hazards, and to ascertain the nature of the coast for settlement.’  
The island was informally known as Cape Blanche Island.  The present name was selected in 2002 via a public competition held in association with the process to proclaim the island and its adjoining waters as a conservation park.  The island's name officially declared in May 2003 after the proclamation of the conservation park in January 2003.
The commercial fishing of greenlip abalone by the use of underwater diving methods takes place in the vicinity of the island.  As of 2006, fishing by diving within the boundaries of the Nicolas Baudin Island Conservation Park is permitted by licence and only during periods outside of the breeding cycle of the Australian sea lion.

Protected areas status

Nicolas Baudin Island received protected area status under the National Parks and Wildlife Act 1972 on 16 January 2003 as part of a conservation park that includes both the island and adjoining waters beyond the low water mark.  The waters adjoining the island are also within a sanctuary zone in the West Coast Bays Marine Park.

See also
List of islands of Australia

Citations and references

Citations

References
	

Islands of South Australia
Uninhabited islands of Australia
Great Australian Bight
Eyre Peninsula